Jerry Services Inc. (doing business as Jerry) is an American company based in Palo Alto, California. Jerry's mobile app offers vehicle and home insurance comparisons, among other services.

Business model
Jerry's mobile app allows users to compare and buy insurance, primarily for vehicle insurance but also home insurance. The software uses artificial intelligence and machine learning, and Jerry generates revenue by earning a percentage of premiums when consumers purchase policies from insurance carriers. Jerry has expanded the "super app" to provide services related to maintenance, financing, repair, warranties, and parking. The app is free to use and available in all fifty U.S. states. The company is a licensed insurance broker for approximately 1 million customers in the U.S., as of August 2021.

History
Jerry was co-founded by Art Agrawal, Musawir Shah, and Lina Zhang in 2017. The company's mobile app launched in January 2019. Agrawal, who previously co-founded YourMechanic, is Jerry's current chief executive officer (CEO). Shah and Zhang serve as chief technology officer and vice president of operations, respectively, as of 2021.

Based in Palo Alto, California, Jerry expanded into Lockport, New York in 2019. The company has 186 employees, as of August 2021. Approximately 60 of the 70 employees in Lockport hold sales and service positions at a call center housed in Harrison Place, a facility formerly operated by the Harrison Radiator Corporation, which is now part of the Western New York Incubator Network and managed by University at Buffalo Business and Entrepreneur Partnerships. Jerry also has an office in Toronto, as of 2021.

Jerry's revenue increased ten-fold between 2019 and 2020. In 2021, Jerry published a report on driver performance based on data about violations.

Funding
Jerry has raised $132 million in venture capital since 2017. Goodwater Capital led the $28 million Series B round in May 2021; other angel investors included Johnson Cook and Timothy Sheehan (president and CEO of Greenlight, respectively), Brandon Krieg and Ed Robinson of Stash, Jon McNeill (Lyft, Tesla, DVx Ventures), and Jay Vijayan. In August, Jerry raised an additional $75 million in a Series C round which valued the company at $450 million. Goodwater led the round, which also saw participation by Bow Capital, Highland Capital Partners, Kamerra, and Park West Asset Management.

References

External links
 

Companies based in Palo Alto, California